Abdullatief Barnes (29 April 1941 – 28 February 2022), nicknamed "Tiefie", was a South African cricketer. He played in 28 first-class matches between 1971 and 1978.

Barnes played in the side representing Transvaal.

See also
 International cricket in South Africa from 1971 to 1981

References

External links
 

1941 births
2022 deaths
South African Muslims
South African cricketers
Gauteng cricketers
Place of birth missing